Tamanawis Secondary is a public secondary school in Surrey, British Columbia. It is a part of School District 36.

The school provides many choices regarding subjects for its students. Here is a list of some of the subjects offered:

Fine Arts, 
Business, 
Biology,
AP Calculus,
Chemistry,
Drama
Dance,
Home Economics,
French,
Mathematics,
Performing Arts,
Physical Education,
Physics,
Science,
Information Technology,
Woodworking,
Metalworking,
Electronics,
Punjabi,
Spanish
and other after school programs.

History
Tamanawis Secondary was opened in 1994. The school's design is also very similar to that of Elgin Park Secondary School

Sports Programs & Activities
The school is well known for its sports programs, with its basketball and other teams consistently performing well in the BC Provincial Championships. The boys basketball team won the Fraser Valley's in 2014, 2016 and 2018 while finishing 3rd in the Province in 2014 and 2018 and 2nd in 2016. Tamanawis is the only Surrey public school to win the Fraser Valley since 1981. The boys soccer team also won the Fraser Valley's in 2013 and 2015.

Tamanawis is also the home school of STUDIO99, a group of teen filmmakers who make short films in all genres as well as cover many school events, like the Tamanawis Christmas Community Dinner, where the senior jazz band annually makes an appearance.

Also, Tamanawis hosts ; a film festival open to all in the Lower Mainland.  
Tamanawis also hosts a number of clubs including Global Awareness, Empowerment, and Cure for Cancer Club.

Tamanawis Secondary School and Elgin Park Secondary School both share the same architectural design.

Notable alumni
 Scott Hannan (Retired San Jose Sharks Defenseman)
 Natasha Wodak (long-distance runner and Olympian)

Notes

High schools in Surrey, British Columbia
Educational institutions established in 1994
1994 establishments in British Columbia